Harry Steppe (born Abraham Stepner), March 16, 1888 – November 22, 1934 was a Russian Jewish-American actor, musical comedy performer, headliner comedian, writer, librettist, director and producer, who toured North America working in Vaudeville and Burlesque. Steppe performed at several well-known theaters on the Columbia, Mutual and Orpheum circuits. Steppe was one of Bud Abbott's first partners.

Early life
Born in Russia to Orthodox Jewish parents, Steppe emigrated from Moscow to the United States through Ellis Island with his family in 1892. Steppe became a naturalized citizen of the United States in 1899.

Steppe's father was a tailor. His brother Michael was a vocalist. One of Steppe's brothers was named Harry but it is not known if this was an inspiration for part of Steppe's stage name.

Steppe lived in Newark, New Jersey and in Pittsburgh, Pennsylvania. At the age of 29,  Steppe claimed an exemption from the draft for World War I on the grounds that he supported his widowed mother.

Relationships
Steppe married twice. His first wife Beatrice, an actress in "Razzle Dazzle of 1918," died at the age of 25 from the Spanish flu, the same year they were married. This sudden loss may have contributed to speculation about Harry's personal struggles with depression.

Other paramours of Harry Steppe included Vaudeville performers Victoria "Vic" Dayton, whom he married in 1920, Edna Raymond and Leona St. Clair. Steppe was often billed with actress Lola Pierce, to whom he was also reportedly linked romantically.

Career
Known to theater patrons as "The Hebrew Gent," Steppe was billed as a Hebrew, Jewish-dialect or Yiddish-dialect character comedian. One of Steppe's alter egos Ignatz Cohen became a recurring and popular character based on an ethnic Jewish stereotype. Many of Steppe's variety shows featured musical revues and olios with dancing girls, comedy sketches and specialty acts. One performance of Steppe's "Girls from the Follies" featured "eight cycling models with thrilling stunts on wheels," operatic songs, ballroom dancing and chorus girls.

Phil Silvers and others credited Steppe with "introducing the phrase "top banana" into show business jargon in 1927 as a synonym for the top comic on the bill. It rose out of a routine, full of doubletalk, in which three comics tried to share two bananas." Silvers further popularized the term "Top Banana" in his 1951 Broadway musical and 1954 film of the same name. Steppe also claimed to have coined the phrase "Second Banana."

Steppe had a version of a shell game routine called "The Lemon Bit,"  that used lemons instead of peas. He performed it with Bud Abbott in burlesque, and Abbott later performed it with Costello in burlesque; in the Broadway musical "Streets of Paris"; in their movie "In the Navy"; live on the "Colgate Comedy Hour"; and in their television program "The Abbott & Costello Show."

Agents and management
Harry Steppe was represented by several theatrical agencies during his career, including Cain & Davenport and Chamberlain and Lyman Brown. Some of his shows were produced by Sam N. Reichblum and well-known burlesque producer I.H. Herk. Steppe also secured theater bookings through the support of entertainment circuits, or "wheels," like the B.F. Keith Vaudeville Exchange, the Columbia Amusement Company (so-called "clean" burlesque) and the Mutual Burlesque Association.

Death

When Steppe became gravely ill and unable to work, his friends in show business staged a fundraiser on his behalf, however Steppe died in poverty. Pulmonary edema contributed to Steppe's death, according to his death certificate. He was at Bellevue Hospital in New York, New York for two days and had been ill for a month, according to a story in Variety magazine, Nov. 27, 1934. He is buried in New Jersey.

Stage productions
Here is an ever-expanding table of documented theatrical productions.

References

Sources
 "Really The Blues," by Mezz Mezzrow and Bernard Wolfe, Citadel Press (Trade Paper), 1990, pg.27. . Excerpt: "You could see most of the celebrities of the day, colored and white, hanging around the De Luxe. Bill Robinson, the burlesque comedian Harry Steppe, comedian Benny Davis, Joe Frisco, Al Jolson, Sophie Tucker, Blossom Seeley, a lot of Ziegfeld Follies actors..."
 American song: the complete musical theatre companion, by Ken Bloom, 1985, Page 130

External links
Bananas in Entertainment, cites Harry as originator of "Top Banana." Citation derived from newspapers and playbills in the Harvard Theater Collection.

1888 births
1934 deaths
American male comedians
American burlesque performers
Vaudeville performers
Jewish Russian comedians
Jewish American male actors
American people of Russian-Jewish descent
Russian Jews
Emigrants from the Russian Empire to the United States
20th-century American male actors
20th-century American comedians
Jewish American comedians
Jewish American male comedians